Lohio is the sixth and final studio album by Ohio-based indie rock band Ass Ponys. It was released on June 12, 2001, on Checkered Past Records. It was produced by Brad Jones, who also produced their previous album, Some Stupid with a Flare Gun. Ass Ponys frontman Chuck Cleaver thought that the album was the Ass Ponys' best, which was one reason the band disbanded soon after it was released.

Critical reception

Lohio received mixed reviews when it was originally released. One favorable review was written by Kevin Oliver of PopMatters, who wrote that the album "provides ample proof of [Ass Ponys'] natural progression into a kind of alternative-universe country rock." In 2012, Ned Lannamann of the Portland Mercury called Lohio "a dark, weird, marvelous album" and "a record of heartland rock that, for once, accurately reflected the state of the American heartland—one troubled by blight, marginalized by big-box businesses, and pepped up on meth."

Track listing
	Last Night It Snowed –	2:13
	Kung Fu Reference –	3:47
	Donald Sutherland –	3:27
   Black Dot –	3:21
	Dried Up –	4:06
	Only –	2:50
	Fire In The Hole –	3:36
	(Baby) I Love You (Baby) –	3:20
	Calendar Days –	3:44
	Baby In A Jar –	4:18
	Dollar A Day –	3:00
	Butterfly –	6:06
	Nothing Starts Today –	3:05
	Untitled (Hidden Bonus Track) –	0:38

Personnel
Bill Alletzhauser-	Banjo, Guitar (12 String), Guitar (Acoustic), Guitar (Electric), Guitar (Nylon String), Vibraphone, Vocals (Background)
Randy Cheek	- Arp Odyssey, Bass (Upright), Guitar (Baritone), Guitar (Electric), Mini Moog, Shortwave Radio, Vocals (Background)
Chuck Cleaver- Clapping, Guitar (Acoustic), Guitar (Electric), Jaw Harp, Vocals, Vocals (Background)
Robin Eaton-	 Mixing
Dave Morrison- Arp Odyssey, Drums, Harmonium, Mini Moog, Organ, Percussion, Piano, Sampling, Vocals (Background)
Tom Sweet-	Graphic Design

References

Ass Ponys albums
Checkered Past Records albums
Albums produced by Brad Jones (musician)
2001 albums